The Loir is a  long river in western France. It is a left tributary of the Sarthe. Its source is in the Eure-et-Loir department, north of Illiers-Combray. It joins the river Sarthe in Briollay, north of the city of Angers.

It is indirectly a tributary of the Loire, and runs roughly parallel to it and slightly north of it for much of its length, and so might be regarded as a Yazoo type river.

Departments and towns crossed include
 Eure-et-Loir (28): Illiers-Combray, Bonneval, Châteaudun, Cloyes-sur-le-Loir
 Loir-et-Cher (41): Fréteval, Morée, Vendôme, Montoire-sur-le-Loir
 Sarthe (72): La Chartre-sur-le-Loir, Château-du-Loir, Le Lude, La Flèche
 Maine-et-Loire (49): Durtal, Lézigné, Seiches-sur-le-Loir

Tributaries include

 Ozanne
 Yerre
 Braye
 Aigre
 Conie

References

Rivers of France
Rivers of Eure-et-Loir
Rivers of Loir-et-Cher
Rivers of Maine-et-Loire
Rivers of Sarthe
Rivers of Centre-Val de Loire
Rivers of Pays de la Loire